The 15067/15068 Gorakhpur–Bandra Terminus Express is an Express train belonging to North Eastern Railway zone that runs between  and Bandra Terminus in India. It is currently being operated with 15067/15068 train numbers on a weekly basis.

Service

15067/ Gorakhpur–Bandra Terminus Express has an average speed of 50 km/hr and covers 1901.2 km in 37h 40m.

The 15068/ Bandra Terminus–Gorakhpur Express has an average speed of 46 km/hr and covers 1901.2 km in 41h 15m.

Route and halts 

The important halts of the train are:

 Gorakhpur Junction
 Anand Nagar Junction
 Barhini
 Tulsipur
 Gonda Junction
 Lucknow Charbagh NR
 Kanpur Central
 Jhansi Junction
 HabibGanj
 Itarsi Junction
 Bhusaval Junction
 Bhestan
 Borivali
 Bandra Terminus

Schedule

Coach composition

The train has standard ICF coach with a max speed of 53KM/HR. The train consists of 23 coaches:

 1 AC II Tier
 3 AC III Tier
 9 Sleeper coaches
 10 Second Class Unreserved
 2 Seating cum Luggage Rake

Traction

Both trains are hauled by a Locomotive shed, Vadodara or Locomotive shed, Bhusaval-based WAP-4E or WAP-4 electric locomotive from Gorakhpur to Bandra Terminus and vice versa.

See also 

 Gorakhpur Junction railway station
 Bandra Terminus

Notes

References

External links 

 15067/Gorakhpur - Bandra Terminus Express
 15068/Bandra Terminus - Gorakhpur Express

Transport in Mumbai
Express trains in India
Passenger trains originating from Gorakhpur
Rail transport in Madhya Pradesh
Rail transport in Maharashtra
Rail transport in Gujarat
Railway services introduced in 2016